Protestant prayer beads may refer to:

Anglican prayer beads, used by Anglicans and other Protestants, such as Methodists
Wreath of Christ, used by Lutherans